This Long Pursuit is an autobiographical book written by biographer Richard Holmes and published by HarperCollins in 2016. It covers his methods, techniques, and memoirs.

Further reading

External links 

 
 Pantheon edition

2016 non-fiction books
Autobiographies
HarperCollins books